The 2018 NAIA football season was the component of the 2018 college football season organized by the National Association of Intercollegiate Athletics (NAIA) in the United States. The season's playoffs, known as the NAIA Football National Championship, culminated with the championship game on December 15, at Daytona Beach Municipal Stadium in Daytona Beach, Florida.

Conference standings

Postseason

Rankings

References